Silvia Cohen (born 24 April 1959) is an Italian actress.

Life and career 
Born in Paris into a family of Jewish origins, at young age Cohen moved with her family to Milan, where she studied acting at the Accademia dei Filodrammatici. She debuted on stage at just 18 years old in 1977, and made her film debut in 1983 in Pasquale Festa Campanile's comedy film Segni particolari: bellissimo. In the early 1990s she started appearing in main roles, in art films and high-profile television productions. She was nominated twice at the Nastro d'Argento awards, in 1996 as best supporting actress for Strane storie and in 1998 as best actress for Consigli per gli acquisti.

References

External links 
 

Italian film actresses
Italian television actresses
Italian stage actresses
1959 births
Actresses from Paris
Living people
Ciak d'oro winners